Football is the most popular sport in Morocco. The governing board for Moroccan football is the Royal Moroccan Football Federation. Football in Morocco witnessed a great development in the last stage, which gained international fame, after the honor and representation of the honorable Moroccan team Raja in the 2013 FIFA Club World Cup, the FIFA international tournament hosted by Morocco when Raja Club Athletic reached the final match against the great German Bundesliga club Bayern Munich. The most popular clubs in Morocco are Raja Casablanca, Wydad Casablanca and ASFAR.

Morocco national football team won the 1976 African Cup of Nations, two African Nations Championships and FIFA Arab Cup once. They have participated in the FIFA World Cup six times. Their best result came in 2022, when they were the first African and Arab national team to reach the semi-finals at the FIFA World Cup.

National competitions

Botola
Nationally, professional football is divided into 2 leagues: the top-tier GNF 1 and the second-tier GNF 2. Botola being the top-tier league. Only 19 out of 31 clubs managed to win the league: Wydad AC (22), Raja CA (12), ASFAR (12), Maghreb Fes (4), KAC Kenitra (4), Kawkab Marrakech (2), Hassania Agadir (2), Moghreb Tétouan (2), FUS Rabat (1), Olympique Khouribga (1), Racing de Casablanca (1), Renaissance de Settat (1), IR Tanger (1), Olympique de Casablanca (1), Mouloudia Oujda (1), CODM de Meknès (1), Chabab Mohammédia (1), Raja de Beni Mellal (1), Étoile de Casablanca (1).

Coupe du Trône

The Moroccan Throne Cup is a football cup competition in Morocco open to both professional and amateur squads. Only 18 clubs managed to win the cup: AS FAR (12), Wydad Casablanca (9), Raja Casablanca (8), FUS de Rabat (6), Kawkab Marrakesh (6), MAS Fès (4), Mouloudia Oujda (4), Olympique Casablanca (3), Olympique Khouribga (2), Chabab Mohammédia (2), Renaissance Berkane (2), Difaa El Jadida (1), KAC Kenitra (1), Renaissance de Settat (1), CODM Meknès (1), Racing Casablanca (1), TAS Casablanca (1), Majd Casablanca (1).

International competitions

Morocco men's national football team

The Morocco national football team, nicknamed Lions de l'Atlas (Atlas Lions), is the national team of Morocco and is controlled by the Royal Moroccan Football Federation. They were the first African team to qualify directly to the World Cup finals, as they did in 1970. They were the first African team to win a group at the World Cup, which they did in 1986, finishing ahead of Portugal, Poland, and England. Morocco fell to eventual runner-up West Germany 1-0 in the second round. In 2022 Morocco finished top of Group F , ahead of Croatia,Belgium and Canada. At the Round of 16, they beat Spain in a penalty shootout, becoming the first Arab country to reach the quarter-finals. Then the Atlas Lions defeated Portugal by one goal becoming the first African and Arab team to reach the semi-finals.

Morocco won the African Nations Cup once, in 1976. They also won the African Nations Championship in 2018 and 2020, thus becoming the first nation to win back-to-back title.

On 10 December 2022, Morocco defeated Portugal 1-0, thus becoming the first African and Arab national team to reach the semi-finals at the FIFA World Cup.

Morocco women's national football team
 
The Morocco women's national football team represents Morocco in international women's football and is controlled by the Royal Moroccan Football Federation. The team played its first international match in 1998, as part of the 3rd African Women's Championship. On 14th edition of the Women's Africa Cup of Nations the Morocco women's national football team managed to secure a silver medal after a 2-1 loss against South Africa in the 2022 Women's Africa Cup of Nations. They also qualified for the 2023 FIFA Women's World Cup becoming the first Arab country to qualify for the FIFA Women's World Cup.

Clubs 
The Moroccan clubs are the second most titled in African competitions with 24 titles: 1 African Cup Winners' Cup, 2 CAF Cup, 7 CAF Confederation Cup, 7 CAF Champions League, 5 CAF Super Cup and 2 Afro-Asian Club Championship.

Largest Moroccan football stadiums

References

External links
 Maroc.net